The 2009 Louisiana Tech Bulldogs football team represented Louisiana Tech University as a member of the Western Athletic Conference (WAC) during the 2009 NCAA Division I FBS football season. Led by third-year head coach Derek Dooley, the Bulldogs played their home games at Joe Aillet Stadium in Ruston, Louisiana. Louisiana Tech finished the season with a record of 4–8 overall and a mark of 3–5 in conference play, tying for fifth place in the WAC.

Before the season

Recruiting

T-Day spring game

On April 11, 2009, the Red Team beat the White Team 21-0 at Joe Aillet Stadium with 3,042 fans in attendance. ESPN Radio's Sean Fox coached the Red Team, and Nick White, also from ESPN Radio, coached the White Team. After a scoreless first quarter, quarterback Steven Ensminger completed a 40-yard pass to tight end Dennis Morris on a trick play to put the Red Team in scoring position. Running Back Daniel Porter scored on a 2-yard touchdown run to put the Red Team up 6-0. Kicker Joel Hall connected on the extra point to make it 7-0. With 1:08 left in the first half, Ensminger completed a 68-yard touchdown pass to wide receiver Cruz Williams to put the Red Team ahead 13-0. Kicker Dale Wallace converted the extra point to make the score 14-0 Red Team going into halftime. Running back Zach Booker scored on a 45-yard touchdown run with 3:28 left in the game to increase the Red Team's lead to 20-0. Hall completed the extra point to make the final score 21-0. Red Team Linebacker Adrien Cole led all tacklers with nine. Red Team Defensive lineman Ramone Randle recorded two sacks, and cornerback Olajuwon Paige recorded two interceptions for the Red Team.

Schedule

Roster

Coaching staff

Game summaries

Auburn

1st Quarter
 09:24 AUB- Wes Byrum 25 Yd FG 0-3
 05:00 LT- Dennis Morris 19 Yd Pass From Ross Jenkins (Matt Nelson Kick) 7-3
 01:33 AUB- Kodi Burns 1 Yd Run (Wes Byrum Kick) 7-10

2nd Quarter
 00:23 LT- Matt Nelson 20 Yd FG 10-10
 00:00 AUB- Wes Byrum 49 Yd FG 10-13

3rd Quarter
 10:59 AUB- Terrell Zachery 93 Yd Pass From Chris Todd (Wes Byrum Kick) 10-20
 04:28 AUB- Wes Byrum 47 Yd FG 10-23
 00:52 LT- Matt Nelson 46 Yd FG 13-23

4th Quarter
 12:45 AUB- Darvin Adams 17 Yd Pass From Chris Todd (Wes Byrum Kick) 13-30
 05:27 AUB- Onterio McCalebb 3 Yd Run (Wes Byrum Kick) 13-37

Navy

1st Quarter
 11:15 LT- Daniel Porter 3 Yd Run (Matt Nelson Kick) 7-0
 09:02 LT- Phillip Livas 85 Yd Punt Return (Matt Nelson Kick) 14-0
 04:31 NAVY- Joe Buckley 43 Yd FG 14-3
 01:33 NAVY- Cory Finnerty 16 Yd Run (Joe Buckley Kick)14-10

2nd Quarter
 11:10 NAVY- Ricky Dobbs 3 Yd Run (Greg Zingler Run For Two-Point Conversion) 14-18

4th Quarter
 10:31 NAVY- Marcus Curry 3 Yd Run (Joe Buckley Kick) 14-25
 05:50 NAVY- Ricky Dobbs 2 Yd Run (Joe Buckley Kick) 14-32

Nicholls State

1st Quarter
 12:03 LT- Matt Nelson 24 Yd FG 0-3
 09:20 NICH- Ross Schexnayder 48 Yd FG 3-3

2nd Quarter
 14:55 LT- Daniel Porter 2 Yd Run (Matt Nelson Kick) 3-10
 01:19 LT- Matt Nelson 44 Yd FG 3-13

3rd Quarter
 13:57 LT- D.J. Morrow 9 Yd Run (Matt Nelson Kick) 3-20
 12:17 LT- Deon Young 32 Yd Interception Return (Matt Nelson Kick) 3-27
 04:47 LT- Dennis Morris 37 Yd Pass From Ross Jenkins (Matt Nelson Kick) 3-34

4th Quarter
 14:24 LT- Houston Tuminello 6 Yd Pass From Ross Jenkins (Matt Nelson Kick) 3-41
 10:47 NICH- Jacob Witt 24 Yd Run (Ross Schexnayder Kick) 10-41
 08:27 LT- Colby Cameron 1 Yd Run (Matt Nelson Kick) 10-48
 03:50 NICH- Ross Schexnayder 42 Yd FG 13-48

Hawaii

1st Quarter
 06:32 HAW- Scott Enos 36 Yd FG 3-0
 02:39 LT- Daniel Porter 3 Yd Run (Matt Nelson Kick) 3-7

2nd Quarter
 05:39 LT- Matt Nelson 28 Yd FG 3-10
 00:08 HAW- Scott Enos 18 Yd FG 6-10

3rd Quarter
 12:08 LT- Daniel Porter 1 Yd Run (Matt Nelson Kick) 6-17
 02:22 LT- Myke Compton 6 Yd Run (Matt Nelson Kick) 6-24

4th Quarter
 12:05 LT- Matt Nelson 26 Yd FG 6-27

Nevada

1st Quarter
 14:16 LT- Daniel Porter 15 Yd Run (Matt Nelson Kick) 7-0
 04:34 NEV- Talaiasi Puloka Jr. 3 Yd Pass From Colin Kaepernick (Richard Drake Kick) 7-7
 00:29 NEV- Colin Kaepernick 5 Yd Run (Richard Drake Kick) 7-14

2nd Quarter
 10:22 NEV- Richard Drake 40 Yd FG 7-17

3rd Quarter
 10:15 NEV- Brandon Wimberly 24 Yd Pass From Colin Kaepernick (Pat Failed) 7-23
 09:56 LT- Daniel Porter 64 Yd Run (Matt Nelson Kick) 14-23
 01:57 NEV- Colin Kaepernick 67 Yd Run (Richard Drake Kick) 14-30

4th Quarter
 14:49 NEV- Virgil Green 3 Yd Pass From Colin Kaepernick (Richard Drake Kick) 14-37

New Mexico State

1st Quarter
 08:56 LT- Matt Nelson 26 Yd FG 0-3
 04:07 LT- Myke Compton 10 Yd Run (Matt Nelson Kick) 0-10

2nd Quarter
 09:00 LT- Ross Jenkins 1 Yd Run (Matt Nelson Kick) 0-17
 00:57 LT- Dennis Morris 29 Yd Pass From Ross Jenkins (Matt Nelson Kick) 0-24

3rd Quarter
 11:07 LT- Adrian Linwood 32 Yd Pass From Ross Jenkins (Matt Nelson Kick) 0-31
 06:42 LT- Dennis Morris 16 Yd Pass From Ross Jenkins (Matt Nelson Kick) 0-38

4th Quarter
 09:15 LT- Lyle Fitte 26 Yd Run (Matt Nelson Kick) 0-45
 04:56 NMSU- Davon House 38 Yd Fumble Return (Kyle Hughes Kick) 7-45

Utah State

2nd Quarter
 13:31 USU- Stanley Morrison 41 Yd Pass From Diondre Borel (Chris Ulinski Kick) 0-7
 11:00 USU- Chris Ulinski 28 Yd FG 0-10
 10:45 LT- Phillip Livas 100 Yd Kickoff Return (Matt Nelson Kick) 7-10
 08:16 USU- Derrvin Speight 44 Yd Run (Chris Ulinski Kick) 7-17
 00:17 USU- Chris Ulinski 27 Yd FG 7-20

3rd Quarter
 05:21 USU- Chris Ulinski 40 Yd FG 7-23

4th Quarter
 10:38 LT- R.P. Stuart 26 Yd Pass From Ross Jenkins (Ross Jenkins Pass To Phillip Livas For Two-Point Conversion) 15-23
 06:15 LT- Dennis Morris 20 Yd Pass From Ross Jenkins (Two-Point Pass Conversion Failed) 21-23

Idaho

1st Quarter
 14:45 IDHO- Justin Veltung 94 Yd Kickoff Return (Trey Farquhar Kick) 0-7
 13:01 LT- Cruz Williams 17 Yd Pass From Ross Jenkins (Matt Nelson Kick) 7-7
 09:27 LT- Daniel Porter 3 Yd Run (Matt Nelson Kick) 14-7
 02:48 LT- Dennis Morris 10 Yd Pass From Ross Jenkins (Matt Nelson Kick) 21-7

2nd Quarter
 14:49 IDHO- Max Komar 36 Yd Pass From Nathan Enderle (Trey Farquhar Kick) 21-14
 06:19 LT- Cruz Williams 20 Yd Pass From Ross Jenkins (Matt Nelson Kick) 28-14

3rd Quarter
 10:38 IDHO- Max Komar 32 Yd Pass From Nathan Enderle (Trey Farquhar Kick) 28-21

4th Quarter
 14:57 LT- Myke Compton 1 Yd Run (Pat Failed) 34-21
 05:51 IDHO- DeMaundray Woolridge 1 Yd Run (Trey Farquhar Kick) 34-28
 00:52 IDHO- DeMaundray Woolridge 2 Yd Run (Trey Farquhar Kick) 34-35

Boise State

1st Quarter
 10:57 BSU- Kyle Brotzman 29 Yd FG 3-0
 08:14 LT- Daniel Porter 1 Yd Run (Matt Nelson Kick) 3-7
 05:03 BSU- Kyle Brotzman 34 Yd FG 6-7
 00:44 BSU- Richie Brockel 2 Yd Pass From Kellen Moore (Kyle Brotzman Kick) 13-7

2nd Quarter
 13:52 BSU- Doug Martin 2 Yd Run (Kyle Brotzman Kick) 20-7
 07:35 BSU- Titus Young 40 Yd Pass From Kellen Moore (Kyle Brotzman Kick) 27-7

3rd Quarter
 13:12 LT- Josh Victorian 75 Yd Interception Return (Matt Nelson Kick) 27-14
 00:31 BSU- Kyle Brotzman 25 Yd FG 30-14
 01:30 LT- Ross Jenkins 9 Yd Run (Matt Nelson Kick) 30-21

4th Quarter
 14:07 LT- Dennis Morris 5 Yd Pass From Ross Jenkins (Matt Nelson Kick) 30-28
 07:41 BSU- Austin Pettis 12 Yd Pass From Kellen Moore (Kellen Moore Pass To Tyler Shoemaker For Two-Point Conversion) 38-28
 04:52 BSU- Jeremy Avery 44 Yd Run (Kyle Brotzman Kick) 45-28
 02:49 LT- Myke Compton 1 Yd Run (Matt Nelson Kick) 45-35

LSU

1st Quarter
 09:08 LSU- Josh Jasper 35 Yd FG 0-3
 04:23 LT- Matt Nelson 30 Yd FG 3-3
 01:55 LSU- Brandon LaFell 38 Yd Pass From Jarrett Lee (Josh Jasper Kick) 3-10
2nd Quarter
 05:39 LT- Matt Nelson 33 Yd FG 6-10
 00:00 LT- Dennis Morris 1 Yd Pass From Daniel Porter (Matt Nelson Kick) 13-10
3rd Quarter
 06:59 LSU- Keiland Williams 3 Yd Run (Josh Jasper Kick) 13-17
4th Quarter
 07:01 LSU- Keiland Williams 9 Yd Run (Josh Jasper Kick) 13-24
 00:25 LT- Matt Nelson 36 Yd FG 16-24

Fresno State

1st Quarter
 14:37 LT- Dennis Morris 50 Yd Pass From Ross Jenkins (Matt Nelson Kick) 7-0
 07:04 FRES- Seyi Ajirotutu 23 Yd Pass From Ryan Colburn (Kevin Goessling Kick) 7-7
 06:47 FRES- Ben Jacobs 21 Yd Fumble Return (Kevin Goessling Kick) 7-14
 03:07 LT- Dennis Morris 12 Yd Pass From Ross Jenkins (Matt Nelson Kick) 14-14

2nd Quarter
 13:56 FRES- Lonyae Miller 5 Yd Run (Kevin Goessling Kick) 14-21
 10:44 LT- Dennis Morris 39 Yd Pass From Ross Jenkins (Matt Nelson Kick) 21-21

3rd Quarter
 08:27 FRES- Kevin Goessling 24 Yd FG 21-24
 04:51 LT- Cruz Williams 36 Yd Pass From Ross Jenkins (Matt Nelson Kick) 28-24

4th Quarter
 12:50 FRES- Kevin Goessling 23 Yd FG 28-27
 00:00 FRES- Kevin Goessling 35 Yd FG 28-30

San Jose State

1st Quarter
 10:20 SJSU- Marquis Avery 16 Yd Pass From Kyle Reed (Philip Zavala Kick) 7-0
 07:54 LT- Daniel Porter 8 Yd Run (Matt Nelson Kick) 7-7
 03:17 SJSU- Jalal Beauchman 2 Yd Pass From Kyle Reed (Philip Zavala Kick) 14-7
 01:48 LT- Daniel Porter 39 Yd Run (Matt Nelson Kick) 14-14
2nd Quarter
 13:02 LT- Dennis Morris 19 Yd Pass From D.J. Morrow (Matt Nelson Kick) 14-21
 12:06 LT- Deon Young 55 Yd Interception Return (Matt Nelson Kick) 14-28
 09:14 LT- Lyle Fitte 38 Yd Pass From Ross Jenkins (Matt Nelson Kick) 14-35
 02:51 LT- Daniel Porter 3 Yd Run (Matt Nelson Kick) 14-42
 00:00 LT- Matt Nelson 39 Yd FG 14-45
3rd Quarter
 08:51 SJSU- Marquis Avery 80 Yd Pass From Jordan La Secla (Two-Point Conversion Failed) 20-45
 01:53 LT- Matt Nelson 32 Yd FG 20-48
4th Quarter
 06:31 LT- Tank Calais 96 Yd Interception Return (Matt Nelson Kick) 20-55

References

Louisiana Tech
Louisiana Tech Bulldogs football seasons
Louisiana Tech Bulldogs football